Just Loving You is the second album by actress and singer Anita Harris, released in 1967 on the Columbia label. It charted at #29 on the UK Albums Chart and spawned the singles Just Loving You, The Playground and Anniversary Waltz.

Track listing
"Anniversary Waltz" (A. Dubin/D. Franklin)
"You've Lost That Lovin' Feelin'" (B. Mann/K. Weil/P. Spector)
"Land of Dragon Dreams" (Mike Margolis/P. Akehurst)
"As Comes the Night (from the Motion Picture "Mr. Sebastian)" (H. Shaper/J. Goldsmith)
"The Playground" (Anita Harris/Mike Margolis/Alan Tew)
"Just Loving You" (Tom Springfield)
"Ava Maria" (Gounod, Arr. by Alan Tew)
"Turn Around" (Harry Belafonte/Malvina Reynolds/A. Greene)
"Crying For the Near" (Mike Margolis/Alan Tew)
"My Favourite Occupation (from the musical Charlie Girl)" (J. Taylor)
"The Night Has Flown" (David Whitaker/Mike Margolis)
"The Beatles Rhapsody (Penny Lane, Strawberry Fields Forever, All You Need Is Love)" (John Lennon/Paul McCartney)

Production
Produced and directed by Mike Margolis
Musical Directors - Alan Tew & David Whitaker 
Sound Engineer - Keith Grant

References

1967 albums
Anita Harris albums
Columbia Records albums